Euptera elabontas, the common euptera, is a butterfly in the family Nymphalidae. It is found in Ivory Coast, Ghana, Benin, Nigeria, Cameroon, Equatorial Guinea, Gabon, the Republic of the Congo, the Central African Republic, the Democratic Republic of the Congo, Uganda, Kenya, Tanzania and Zambia. Its habitat consists of forests.

Adults are attracted to fermenting bananas.

The larvae feed on Synsepalum dulcificum, Synsepalum letouzeyi, Synsepalum longecuneatum, Vincentella revoluta and Englerophytum species.

Subspecies
Euptera elabontas elabontas (central and eastern Ivory Coast, Ghana: Kumasi, Benin, Nigeria, Cameroon, Gabon, Congo, Central African Republic, Democratic Republic of the Congo, north-western Tanzania)
Euptera elabontas canui Collins, 1995 (Bioko)
Euptera elabontas mweruensis Neave, 1910 (Uganda, western Kenya, north-western Tanzania, Democratic Republic of the Congo: Shaba, Zambia)

References

Butterflies described in 1871
Euptera
Butterflies of Africa
Taxa named by William Chapman Hewitson